Nizam State Rail & Road Transport Department (N.S.R-R.T.D) was a wing of the Nizam's Guaranteed State Railway in the former Hyderabad State. It was the first Road Transport Department to nationalize passenger Road Transport Services in the year of 1932.

History
Beginning in 1932, scheduled bus services – under the auspices of the railway administration – began over 450 km with 27 vehicles. Within a decade, at a total expense of 7½ million HRs. this was extended to nearly 500 vehicles, servicing 7200 km.

The last Nizam Osman Ali Khan, Asaf Jah VII handed over the (N.S.R-R.T.D) to the Indian Government and he made an agreement that every bus number should include the letter Z, as the letter ‘Z’ in the number plate represents Zahra Begum, mother of Nawab Osman Ali Khan, Asaf Jah VII.
On 1 November 1951 it is renamed as a Department of Hyderabad State Government and later formed as APSRTC in 1958.

See also
Andhra Pradesh State Road Transport Corporation
Telangana State Road Transport Corporation

References 

Transport in Andhra Pradesh
State agencies of Andhra Pradesh
Transport in Telangana
State agencies of Telangana
Transport companies established in 1932
Companies based in Hyderabad, India
State road transport corporations of India
Establishments in Hyderabad State
Indian companies established in 1932